The Tower of Poghju is a Genoese tower in Corsica, located in the hamlet of Poggio in the commune of Tomino, Haute-Corse.

The tower was probably built in the second half of the sixteenth century. It was one of a series of defences constructed by the Republic of Genoa between 1530 and 1620 to stem the attacks by Barbary pirates.

The base of the tower would have originally contained a cistern to hold rainwater collected from the roof terrace but in the nineteenth century an entrance door was constructed at the ground floor level. In 2009 the tower was added to the "General Inventory of Cultural Heritage" (Inventaire général du patrimoine culturel) maintained by the French Ministry of Culture. It is privately owned.

See also
List of Genoese towers in Corsica

Notes and references

Towers in Corsica
Monuments historiques of Corsica